Morecambe is a seaside town and civil parish in the City of Lancaster district in Lancashire, England. It is in Morecambe Bay on the Irish Sea.

Name

The first use of the name was by John Whitaker in his History of Manchester (1771), when he refers to the "æstury of Moricambe". It next appears four years later in Antiquities of Furness, where the bay is described as "the Bay of Morecambe".

That name is derived from the Roman name Moriancabris Æsturis shown on maps prepared for them by Claudius Ptolemœus (Ptolemy) from his original Greek maps. At this distance in time it is impossible to say if the name was originally derived from an earlier language (e.g. Celtic language) or from Greek. The Latin version describes the fourth inlet north from Wales on the west coast of England as Moriancabris Æsturis. Translated, this gives a more accurate description than the present name of Morecambe Bay as the Latin refers to multiple estuaries on a curved sea, not a bay, as then the word sinus or gulf would have been used.

The name appeared in March 1862 on a steam locomotive built for the South Durham and Lancashire Union Railway, which could indicate it was already in unofficial use for the area.

It was not until 1889 that the necessary legislation was passed to officially name the area Morecambe, comprising the hamlets of Poulton, Bare and Torrisholme (a township for the purposes of the Census of 1841 but shown as separate townships in the previous Census of 1831). In 1894, the Urban District Council was formed, thus freeing Morecambe completely from its governance by the Borough of Lancaster until 1974 when Lancaster again took charge.

Before the creation of Morecambe, Poulton acquired two suffixes, "le Sands" and briefly "by Sands". The reason for these additions stems from the dearth of names of townships in earlier times with the same name recurring over again. In the days before free movement of people, this was not so important. As travel became easier through first the turnpikes and later the railways, it became necessary to differentiate between the various towns with the same name, hence the additions.

On 3 August 1928, the name changed again when the Corporation of Morecambe amalgamated with Heysham Urban District Council to form the Municipal Borough of Morecambe and Heysham.

History

In 1846, the Morecambe Harbour and Railway Company was formed to build a harbour on Morecambe Bay, close to the fishing village of Poulton-le-Sands, and a connecting railway. By 1850, the railway linked to Skipton, Keighley and Bradford in the West Riding of Yorkshire, and a settlement began to grow around the harbour and railway to service the port and as a seaside resort. The settlement expanded to absorb Poulton and the villages of Bare and Torrisholme. The settlement started to be referred to as "Morecambe", possibly after the harbour and railway. In 1889, the new name was officially adopted.

Morecambe was a thriving seaside resort in the mid-20th century. It was home to the largest Pontins resort in the country. Pontins closed in 1993. While the resort of Blackpool attracted holiday-makers predominantly from the Lancashire mill towns, Morecambe had more visitors from Yorkshire (due to its railway connection) and Scotland. Mill workers from Bradford and further afield in West Yorkshire would holiday at Morecambe, with some retiring there. This gave Morecambe the nickname "Bradford on Sea". Between 1956 and 1989, it was the home of the Miss Great Britain beauty contest.

Morecambe suffered a decades-long decline after a series of incidents that damaged tourism and the local economy. Two piers were lost: West End Pier was partly washed away in a storm in November 1977, and the remnants were demolished in 1978; Central Pier, damaged by fire in 1933, was removed in 1992. In 1994, The World of Crinkley Bottom attraction in Happy Mount Park closed only thirteen weeks after opening. The ensuing Blobbygate scandal, a financial disaster after projected visitor numbers did not materialise, led to a legal battle between Lancaster City Council and TV star Noel Edmonds, costing North Lancs taxpayers £2.6 million. The closures of Bubbles, Morecambe's swimming pool, and the Frontierland fairground soon followed.

Morecambe was selected by the RNLI as the location for its first active life-saving hovercraft. (Griffon 470SAR) H-002 "The Hurley Flyer", which became operational on 23 December 2002, was housed in a temporary garage next to the Yacht Club until a permanent building could be designed and built. Work on the latter began in 2008, and it officially opened on 12 June 2010.

On 5 February 2004, there was a major loss of life in Morecambe Bay when at least 21 Chinese immigrant shellfish harvesters were drowned after they became trapped by the incoming tide.

In December 2017 a local general practitioner and community health activist claimed that children in Morecambe were suffering from malnourishment and implied that cases of rickets had been observed as a consequence. The Morecambe Bay Clinical Commissioning Group subsequently sought to correct the GP's claims and clarified the aetiology of vitamin D deficiency in the local population, explaining "rickets is a very rare condition and has multiple causes".

The "Morecambe Budget"

Enoch Powell made a speech in Morecambe on 11 October 1968 on the economy, setting out alternative, radical free-market policies that would later be called the Morecambe Budget. Powell used the financial year 1968–69 to show how income tax could be halved from 8s 3d to 4s 3d in the pound (basic rate cut from 41% to 21%) and how capital gains tax and Selective Employment Tax could be abolished without reducing expenditure on defence or the social services. These tax cuts required a saving of £2,855 million, and this would be funded by eradicating losses in the nationalised industries and denationalising the profit-making state concerns; ending all housing subsidies except for those who could not afford their own housing; ending all foreign aid; ending all grants and subsidies in agriculture; ending all assistance to development areas; ending all investment grants; abolishing the National Economic Development Council; and abolishing the Prices and Incomes Board The cuts in taxation would also allow the state to borrow from the public to spend on capital projects such as hospitals and roads and on the firm and humane treatment of criminals.

Governance

The town is in the Morecambe and Lunesdale parliamentary constituency; the current Member of parliament is David Morris.

Before Brexit, it was in the North West England European Parliamentary Constituency.

Morecambe is governed by three tiers of Local Government:
 Morecambe Town Council,
 Lancaster City Council (District),
 Lancashire County Council.

Economy

Morecambe's main central shopping area incorporates two markets—the Festival Market and the Morecambe Sunday Market—and the Reel Cinema complex.

Tourism

Morecambe Hotel and Tourism Association, which had forty members, has merged with the Bay Tourism Association. At a full meeting of the Morecambe Hotel and Tourism Association on Monday 8 March 2010, it was unanimously resolved that the MHTA would join with Bay Tourism to become one association under the name of the Bay Tourism Association and the MHTA would cease to operate as an association. The BTA works closely with Lancaster Chamber and organises joint promotional ventures with other tourism associations in the region.
Recent tourism initiatives have made Morecambe a centre for bird watchers with the Tern Project enhancing the town's heritage linked to the extensive natural landscape of Morecambe Bay and its diverse wildlife.

Eden Project North

In 2018, the Eden Project revealed its design for the Eden Project North on the seafront in Morecambe. There will be biodomes shaped like mussels and a focus on the marine environment. Grimshaw are the architects for the £80 million project, which is a partnership with the Lancashire Enterprise Partnership, Lancaster University, Lancashire County Council and Lancaster City Council.

Education
Morecambe is served by a number of primary, secondary and tertiary educational establishments. These include Morecambe Bay Academy, Bay Leadership Academy and Lancaster and Morecambe College.

Culture

Performing arts
Morecambe has two large live-music venues: the Platform and More Music. The Platform is a converted Victorian-styled building which used to be the old railway station. It also houses the Morecambe Tourist Information Centre. Morecambe has a number of bands playing in the town's pubs and music venues.

Morecambe is home to community music charity More Music. More Music was established in 1993 and is based in the Hothouse. The Hothouse is now a venue for live gigs.

Morecambe and Alan Bennett

The Yorkshire playwright and author Alan Bennett has enjoyed a long association with Morecambe and has often referred to the town in his work and writing. One of his early TV plays, Sunset Across the Bay (1975), is about a couple from Leeds who retire to Morecambe, leaving their old home with the words "Bye bye, mucky Leeds!" He based the play on memories of the many holidays he spent in Morecambe with his parents. In his essay "Written on the Body", collected in Untold Stories (2005), he even suggests that his association with the town is pre-natal: "[I]t had been in a boarding house that I was conceived, sometime over the August Bank Holiday of 1933 at Morecambe or Filey." In the same collection, Bennett pays tribute to the Morecambe-born actress Thora Hird in the essays Last of the Sun, about the final play he wrote for her, and "Thora Hird 1911–2003", a memoir of the work they had done together since the 1960s. Earlier in the book, he discusses his maternal aunt Kathleen, who married in Morecambe and lived there until her death in 1974.

Art
Morecambe was the birthplace of the artist William Woodhouse (1857–1939), who lived all his life in the town and is buried with his wife and daughter at St. Peter's Church in the village of Heysham, a little to the south of Morecambe.

Youth and Community

Stanley's Youth and Community Centre is based on Stanley Road in the West End of Morecambe. It offers the opportunity for young people aged 8–18 to play music, cook or just use the facilities to catch up with friends. There are also community sessions including community meal, women's group and 'Get Connected' information service.

The Exchange, which was set up in 2015 and is based on West Street in the West End of Morecambe, is a Community Arts CIC, offering free creative workshops to local residents. Promoting creativity as a means of well-being, it serves as a non-profit welcome space for all ages and abilities. In addition to workshops, The Exchange sells the artwork of local residents and hosts events such as the popular Soup Night.

Cuisine
Morecambe Bay potted shrimps are a famous local delicacy.

Landmarks

One of Morecambe's most famous landmarks is a statue commemorating one of its most famous sons, Eric Morecambe. It was created by sculptor Graham Ibbeson.

One of Morecambe's landmark buildings is the partially renovated Victoria Pavilion or Morecambe Winter Gardens.  This was once a venue for swimming baths, a grand theatre, a restaurant and a ballroom.

Morecambe's current library opened in 1967; it was designed by the office of the architect Roger Booth. It replaced the Victoria Street library, which opened in 1928. There had been earlier proposals to build a library in Morecambe with Carnegie funding, but arguments about the rates involved stalled the project. The library is mentioned by Pevsner and is one of the few noteworthy buildings, other than churches, that are not connected to the seaside trade. The building is formed by hexagons, with a hyperbolic parabolic roof, creating a distinctive skyline and interior.

Morecambe once boasted two fairgrounds: a small one to the north of the railway station, which closed down in the 1980s, and a larger one to the south of the station, which ultimately became Frontierland and closed in 1999. The last remaining landmark on the site was the Polo Tower, left standing only because of the contract for the phone mast on top. This was demolished mid 2017.

In July 2008, the local council ordered a clean-up of the Polo Tower, and scaffolding was erected around the structure to carry out a survey. It was demolished in sections, in July 2017.

Near the promenade is the Morecambe and Heysham War Memorial which commemorates the men of Morecambe who lost their lives in the two world wars and the Korean War. The memorial differs from most as it lists the First World War as 1914 to 1919 rather than 1914 to 1918.

In March 2019 a Time and Tide Bell designed by Marcus Vergette was installed beside the Stone Jetty, as part of a national public art project.

Midland Hotel

The Midland Hotel is an art deco hotel on the seafront. It contains interior design and art pieces by artist Eric Gill. In 2009 it underwent a £7m restoration, headed by Manchester company Urban Splash. The hotel re-opened for business in June 2008.

In March 2011 Urban Splash sold the freehold of the building to Lancashire-based 'The Lancaster Foundation'.

Media

Local weekly newspapers include The Visitor published on Tuesdays and the Morecambe Guardian, a local edition of the Lancaster Guardian published on Fridays.

A monthly publication entitled Local Choice is delivered by Royal Mail to every household in the district.

Sport

Football

Morecambe F.C. (known as 'the Shrimps') are the leading local football club and on 20 May 2007 won the Conference National playoffs to earn promotion to the Football League for the first time in their history. As of 2021–22, they play in League One. They had a successful first season in the Football League, surprising a few teams, and in the 2009–10 season they reached the play-offs, only to lose 7–2, on aggregate, to eventual winners Dagenham & Redbridge.
At the end of the 2009–10 season the team moved from its Christie Park ground to a brand new home, the Globe Arena. The old ground was demolished to make way for a Sainsbury's supermarket.
On 31 May 2021, Morecambe won the League Two play-off Final at Wembley, beating Newport County 1-0 after extra time to win promotion to League One for the first time in their history.

Rugby league
When the rugby football schism occurred in 1895, the now defunct Morecambe RFC joined the Northern Rugby Football Union (now Rugby Football League) in its second season. Morecambe played for eight of the ten seasons from the 1896–97 season through to the end of 1905–06 season. Morecambe finished 14th of 14 in its first three seasons of the Lancashire Senior Competition, withdrew for the 1899–1900 and 1900–01 seasons, finished 11th of 13 in the Lancashire Senior Competition, then finished 17th of 18, 16th of 17, 13th of 14 in Division-2, and finally 30th of 31 in the recombined league, after which Morecambe withdrew from the Northern Rugby Football Union.

The town still hosts a rugby league team, with Heysham Atoms playing from their Trimpell Sports and Social Club base. The Atoms finished joint top of division three in the North West Counties in 2012.

Boxing
Morecambe has a Commonwealth Featherweight Champion, Isaac Lowe, who beat Marco McCullough in the 8th round with in one minute and 56 seconds on the Frampton Vs Quigg Under-card World Heavyweight Champion Tyson Fury lives nearby and is often seen in and around Morecambe.

Running
A 5 km parkrun event takes place every Saturday morning on the Promenade. The first event was held in April 2019.

Transport

Rail

Trains also run to Heysham, where they connect with the ferry service to the Isle of Man. There is another railway station at Bare Lane, serving the suburb of Bare. Services are operated by Northern.

There was also a station called , built by the rival London & North Western Railway, which closed in 1963.

Bus
Bus services in the area are operated mainly by Stagecoach Cumbria & North Lancashire  & other local companies. Direct services link the town with Windermere and Bowness-on-Windermere via Carnforth, Milnthorpe and Kendal (755), Lancaster with connections to Keswick via Carnforth, Milnthorpe, Kendal, Windermere, Ambleside and Grasmere  (555), Carnforth (5, 55, 755), and, all via Garstang,  Preston (40/41), Blackpool (42). Regular services up to every 15 minutes (numbers 41/100) operate along the promenade to Heysham and to Lancaster University, a bus route also runs from the bus station via Heysham and then fast to Lancaster (number 2X), while service 1 and 1A operate up to every 10 minutes from Euston Road to both Heysham and Lancaster University. Services 6 and 6A operate via Westgate (where most caravan holiday parks are) to the Asda supermarket and Salt Ayre Leisure Centre. Service 5 operates to Overton and Carnforth. Most services (2X/4/6/6A/40/41/42/100/555/755) operate using Low Floor Easy Access Vehicles suitable for wheelchair users and prams/pushchairs.

Morecambe in popular culture
 Morecambe and the neighbouring village of Heysham are the setting of the Cthulhu Mythos novel The Weird Shadow over Morecambe, published by the writer Edmund Glasby in 2014. The title of the book is a reference to H.P. Lovecraft's story "The Shadow over Innsmouth", which is also set in a seaside town.
 Morecambe was mentioned in an episode of the prison-set television comedy Porridge first broadcast in 1973: "...  Fletchers's old woman said she wasn't returning, cos she was going to live with that Maltese ponce in Morecambe.".
 The 1960 film The Entertainer, starring Laurence Olivier and Joan Plowright, was filmed on location in the town. Morecambe-born actress Thora Hird co-starred.
 Sunset across the Bay is a play by Alan Bennett written in 1975 for the BBC Play for Today strand, set and filmed in Morecambe.
 Morecambe is extensively written about in Bill Bryson's "Notes From A Small Island". (1995).
 The ITV series, The Bay, is set and filmed in Morecambe. Series 1 was first aired in March 2019 and Series 2 was first aired in January 2021. Series 3, filmed in and around Morecambe, was first aired in January 2022.
Morecambe is the setting for the first half of Sarah Hall's book, The Electric Michelangelo.
 Morecambe features in The Acoustics of Morecambe Bay, a music theatre piece by Peter McGarr which evokes the sound contrast between bay and town.

Notable people
See 
Emma Atkins - actress
Dave Chisnall Professional darts player lives in Morecambe.
Tyson Fury - boxer (World Heavyweight Champion 2015–16, 2020-) lives in Morecambe.
Paul Hayes - antiques expert, TV personality
Wayne Hemingway - designer, founder of Red or Dead and Northern Soul DJ
Graham Hicks - strongman
Dame Thora Hird - actress
Isaac Lowe - Commonwealth boxing champion
John McGuinness - motorcycle racer
Albert Modley - Yorkshire comedian
Eric Morecambe OBE - comedian, who took his stage name from the town's name
Radford family - UK's largest family, consisting of Sue and Noel Radford, who as of June 2022 have 22 children and 12 grandchildren
Peter J. Ratcliffe - Nobel prize-winning biologist

Climate

See also

Listed buildings in Morecambe

Notes

References

Further reading

External links

 Morecambe Visitor Information
 Bay Tourism Association
 Morecambe Newspaper Morecambe's weekly newspaper and local resources.
 Lancaster and Morecambe Citizen newspaper News and sport updated daily
 Morecambe Library

 
Geography of the City of Lancaster
Towns in Lancashire
Seaside resorts in Lancashire
Morecambe Bay
Beaches of Lancashire
Civil parishes in Lancashire
Populated coastal places in Lancashire